This is a list of the mammal species recorded in Niger. There are 136 mammal species in Niger, of which two are critically endangered, two are endangered, nine are vulnerable, and one is near threatened. One of the species listed for Niger can no longer be found in the wild.

The following tags are used to highlight each species' conservation status as assessed by the International Union for Conservation of Nature:

Some species were assessed using an earlier set of criteria. Species assessed using this system have the following instead of near threatened and least concern categories:

Order: Tubulidentata (aardvarks) 

The order Tubulidentata consists of a single species, the aardvark. Tubulidentata are characterised by their teeth which lack a pulp cavity and form thin tubes which are continuously worn down and replaced.

Family: Orycteropodidae
Genus: Orycteropus
Aardvark, O. afer

Order: Hyracoidea (hyraxes) 

The hyraxes are any of four species of fairly small, thickset, herbivorous mammals in the order Hyracoidea. About the size of a domestic cat they are well-furred, with rounded bodies and a stumpy tail. They are native to Africa and the Middle East.

Family: Procaviidae (hyraxes)
Genus: Dendrohyrax
 Western tree hyrax, D. dorsalis 
Genus: Procavia
 Cape hyrax, P. capensis

Order: Proboscidea (elephants) 

The elephants comprise three living species and are the largest living land animals.
Family: Elephantidae (elephants)
Genus: Loxodonta
African forest elephant, L. cyclotis

Order: Sirenia (manatees and dugongs) 

Sirenia is an order of fully aquatic, herbivorous mammals that inhabit rivers, estuaries, coastal marine waters, swamps, and marine wetlands. All four species are endangered.

Family: Trichechidae
Genus: Trichechus
 African manatee, T. senegalensis

Order: Primates 

The order Primates contains humans and their closest relatives: lemurs, lorisoids, tarsiers, monkeys, and apes.

Suborder: Strepsirrhini
Infraorder: Lemuriformes
Superfamily: Lorisoidea
Family: Galagidae
Genus: Galago
 Senegal bushbaby, Galago senegalensis LR/lc
Suborder: Haplorhini
Infraorder: Simiiformes
Parvorder: Catarrhini
Superfamily: Cercopithecoidea
Family: Cercopithecidae (Old World monkeys)
Genus: Erythrocebus
 Patas monkey, Erythrocebus patas LR/lc
Genus: Chlorocebus
 Tantalus monkey, Chlorocebus tantalus LR/lc
Genus: Papio
 Olive baboon, Papio anubis LR/lc

Order: Rodentia (rodents) 

Rodents make up the largest order of mammals, with over 40% of mammalian species. They have two incisors in the upper and lower jaw which grow continually and must be kept short by gnawing.

Suborder: Hystricognathi
Family: Hystricidae (Old World porcupines)
Genus: Hystrix
 Crested porcupine, Hystrix cristata LC
Suborder: Sciurognathi
Family: Sciuridae (squirrels)
Subfamily: Xerinae
Tribe: Xerini
Genus: Xerus
 Striped ground squirrel, Xerus erythropus LC
Tribe: Protoxerini
Genus: Funisciurus
 Kintampo rope squirrel, Funisciurus substriatus DD
Family: Gliridae (dormice)
Subfamily: Graphiurinae
Genus: Graphiurus
 Kellen's dormouse, Graphiurus kelleni DD
Family: Dipodidae (jerboas)
Subfamily: Dipodinae
Genus: Jaculus
 Lesser Egyptian jerboa, Jaculus jaculus LC
Family: Nesomyidae
Subfamily: Dendromurinae
Genus: Steatomys
 Northwestern fat mouse, Steatomys caurinus LC
 Dainty fat mouse, Steatomys cuppedius LC
Subfamily: Cricetomyinae
Genus: Cricetomys
 Gambian pouched rat, Cricetomys gambianus LC
Family: Muridae (mice, rats, voles, gerbils, hamsters, etc.)
Subfamily: Deomyinae
Genus: Acomys
 Western Saharan spiny mouse, Acomys airensis LC
 Johan's spiny mouse, Acomys johannis LC
Subfamily: Gerbillinae
Genus: Desmodilliscus
 Pouched gerbil, Desmodilliscus braueri LC
Genus: Dipodillus
 North African gerbil, Dipodillus campestris LC
Genus: Gerbillus
 Lesser Egyptian gerbil, Gerbillus gerbillus LC
 Pygmy gerbil, Gerbillus henleyi LC
 Sudan gerbil, Gerbillus nancillus DD
 Balochistan gerbil, Gerbillus nanus LC
 Nigerian gerbil, Gerbillus nigeriae LC
 Greater Egyptian gerbil, Gerbillus pyramidum LC
 Tarabul's gerbil, Gerbillus tarabuli LC
Genus: Meriones
 Sundevall's jird, Meriones crassus LC
Genus: Gerbilliscus
 Kemp's gerbil, Gerbilliscus kempi LC
 Fringe-tailed gerbil, Gerbilliscus robustus LC
Genus: Taterillus
 Gracile tateril, Taterillus gracilis LC
 Petter's gerbil, Taterillus petteri LC
 Senegal gerbil, Taterillus pygargus LC
Subfamily: Murinae
Genus: Arvicanthis
 Sudanian grass rat, Arvicanthis ansorgei LC
 African grass rat, Arvicanthis niloticus LC
Genus: Lemniscomys
 Heuglin's striped grass mouse, Lemniscomys zebra LC
Genus: Mastomys
 Guinea multimammate mouse, Mastomys erythroleucus LC
 Hubert's multimammate mouse, Mastomys huberti LC
 Verheyen's multimammate mouse, Mastomys kollmannspergeri LC
 Natal multimammate mouse, Mastomys natalensis LC
Genus: Mus
 Hausa mouse, Mus haussa LC
Genus: Praomys
 Dalton's mouse, Praomys daltoni LC
Family: Ctenodactylidae
Genus: Massoutiera
 Mzab gundi, Massoutiera mzabi LC

Order: Lagomorpha (lagomorphs) 

The lagomorphs comprise two families, Leporidae (hares and rabbits), and Ochotonidae (pikas). Though they can resemble rodents, and were classified as a superfamily in that order until the early 20th century, they have since been considered a separate order. They differ from rodents in a number of physical characteristics, such as having four incisors in the upper jaw rather than two.

Family: Leporidae (rabbits, hares)
Genus: Lepus
 Cape hare, Lepus capensis LR/lc
 African savanna hare, Lepus microtis LR/lc

Order: Erinaceomorpha (hedgehogs and gymnures) 

The order Erinaceomorpha contains a single family, Erinaceidae, which comprise the hedgehogs and gymnures. The hedgehogs are easily recognised by their spines while gymnures look more like large rats.

Family: Erinaceidae (hedgehogs)
Subfamily: Erinaceinae
Genus: Atelerix
 Four-toed hedgehog, Atelerix albiventris LR/lc
Genus: Hemiechinus
 Desert hedgehog, Hemiechinus aethiopicus LR/lc

Order: Soricomorpha (shrews, moles, and solenodons) 

The "shrew-forms" are insectivorous mammals. The shrews and solenodons closely resemble mice while the moles are stout-bodied burrowers.

Family: Soricidae (shrews)
Subfamily: Crocidurinae
Genus: Crocidura
 Cinderella shrew, Crocidura cinderella LC
 Savanna shrew, Crocidura fulvastra LC
 Bicolored musk shrew, Crocidura fuscomurina LC
 Mauritanian shrew, Crocidura lusitania LC
 Savanna path shrew, Crocidura viaria LC
 Voi shrew, Crocidura voi LC

Order: Chiroptera (bats) 

The bats' most distinguishing feature is that their forelimbs are developed as wings, making them the only mammals capable of flight. Bat species account for about 20% of all mammals.

Family: Pteropodidae (flying foxes, Old World fruit bats)
Subfamily: Pteropodinae
Genus: Eidolon
 Straw-coloured fruit bat, Eidolon helvum LC
Genus: Micropteropus
 Peters's dwarf epauletted fruit bat, Micropteropus pusillus LC
Family: Vespertilionidae
Subfamily: Vespertilioninae
Genus: Neoromicia
 Banana pipistrelle, Neoromicia nanus LC
 Rendall's serotine, Neoromicia rendalli LC
Genus: Nycticeinops
 Schlieffen's bat, Nycticeinops schlieffeni LC
Genus: Otonycteris
 Desert long-eared bat, Otonycteris hemprichii LR/lc
Genus: Scotophilus
 White-bellied yellow bat, Scotophilus leucogaster LC
 Greenish yellow bat, Scotophilus viridis LC
Family: Rhinopomatidae
Genus: Rhinopoma
 Egyptian mouse-tailed bat, R. cystops 
 Lesser mouse-tailed bat, Rhinopoma hardwickei LC
 Greater mouse-tailed bat, Rhinopoma microphyllum LC
Family: Molossidae
Genus: Chaerephon
 Lappet-eared free-tailed bat, Chaerephon major LC
 Little free-tailed bat, Chaerephon pumila LC
Genus: Mops
 Angolan free-tailed bat, Mops condylurus LC
 Midas free-tailed bat, Mops midas LC
Family: Emballonuridae
Genus: Taphozous
 Naked-rumped tomb bat, Taphozous nudiventris LC
 Egyptian tomb bat, Taphozous perforatus LC
Family: Nycteridae
Genus: Nycteris
 Gambian slit-faced bat, Nycteris gambiensis LC
 Hairy slit-faced bat, Nycteris hispida LC
 Egyptian slit-faced bat, Nycteris thebaica LC
Family: Megadermatidae
Genus: Lavia
 Yellow-winged bat, Lavia frons LC
Family: Rhinolophidae
Subfamily: Rhinolophinae
Genus: Rhinolophus
 Rüppell's horseshoe bat, Rhinolophus fumigatus LC
 Lander's horseshoe bat, Rhinolophus landeri LC
Subfamily: Hipposiderinae
Genus: Asellia
 Trident leaf-nosed bat, Asellia tridens LC
Genus: Hipposideros
 Sundevall's roundleaf bat, Hipposideros caffer LC
 Noack's roundleaf bat, Hipposideros ruber LC

Order: Pholidota (pangolins) 

The order Pholidota comprises the eight species of pangolin. Pangolins are anteaters and have the powerful claws, elongated snout and long tongue seen in the other unrelated anteater species.

Family: Manidae
Genus: Manis
 Giant pangolin, Manis gigantea LR/lc

Order: Carnivora (carnivorans) 

There are over 260 species of carnivorans, the majority of which eat meat as their primary dietary item. They have a characteristic skull shape and dentition.
Suborder: Feliformia
Family: Felidae (cats)
Subfamily: Felinae
Genus: Acinonyx
 Cheetah, A. jubatus
Northwest African cheetah, A. j. hecki CR
Genus: Caracal
 African golden cat, Caracal aurata VU
 Caracal, Caracal caracal LC
Genus: Felis
African wildcat, F. lybica 
 Sand cat, F. margarita NT
Genus: Leptailurus
 Serval, Leptailurus serval LC
Subfamily: Pantherinae
Genus: Panthera
 Lion, Panthera leo VU
 Leopard, Panthera pardus VU
Family: Viverridae
Subfamily: Viverrinae
Genus: Civettictis
African civet, C. civetta 
Genus: Genetta
Common genet, G. genetta 
 Rusty-spotted genet, Genetta maculata LC
Hausa genet, G. thierryi 
Family: Herpestidae (mongooses)
Genus: Atilax
 Marsh mongoose, Atilax paludinosus LC
Genus: Herpestes
 Egyptian mongoose, Herpestes ichneumon LC
 Common slender mongoose, Herpestes sanguineus LC
Genus: Ichneumia
 White-tailed mongoose, Ichneumia albicauda LC
Genus: Mungos
 Gambian mongoose, Mungos gambianus LC
 Banded mongoose, Mungos mungo LC
Genus: Xenogale
Long-nosed mongoose, Xenogale naso LR/lc
Family: Hyaenidae (hyaenas)
Genus: Crocuta
 Spotted hyena, Crocuta crocuta LC
Genus: Hyaena
 Striped hyena, Hyaena hyaena NT
Suborder: Caniformia
Family: Canidae (dogs, foxes)
Genus: Vulpes
 Pale fox, Vulpes pallida NT
 Rüppell's fox, Vulpes rueppelli NT
 Fennec, Vulpes zerda NT
Genus: Canis
 African golden wolf, Canis lupaster LC
Genus: Lupulella
 Side-striped jackal, L. adusta  
Genus: Lycaon
 African wild dog, Lycaon pictus EN
Family: Mustelidae (mustelids)
Genus: Ictonyx
 Saharan striped polecat, Ictonyx libyca LC
 Striped polecat, Ictonyx striatus LC
Genus: Mellivora
 Honey badger, Mellivora capensis LC
Genus: Hydrictis
 Speckle-throated otter, Hydrictis maculicollis LC
Genus: Aonyx
 African clawless otter, Aonyx capensis LC

Order: Artiodactyla (even-toed ungulates) 

The even-toed ungulates are ungulates whose weight is borne about equally by the third and fourth toes, rather than mostly or entirely by the third as in perissodactyls. There are about 220 artiodactyl species, including many that are of great economic importance to humans.

Family: Suidae (pigs)
Subfamily: Phacochoerinae
Genus: Phacochoerus
 Common warthog, Phacochoerus africanus LR/lc
Family: Hippopotamidae (hippopotamuses)
Genus: Hippopotamus
 Hippopotamus, Hippopotamus amphibius VU
Family: Giraffidae (giraffe, okapi)
Genus: Giraffa
 Giraffe, Giraffa camelopardalis VU
Family: Bovidae (cattle, antelope, sheep, goats)
Subfamily: Alcelaphinae
Genus: Alcelaphus
 Hartebeest, Alcelaphus buselaphus LR/cd
Genus: Damaliscus
 Topi, Damaliscus lunatus LR/cd
Subfamily: Antilopinae
Genus: Gazella
 Dorcas gazelle, Gazella dorcas VU
 Rhim gazelle, Gazella leptoceros EN
 Red-fronted gazelle, Gazella rufifrons VU
Genus: Nanger
 Dama gazelle, Nanger dama CR
Genus: Ourebia
 Oribi, Ourebia ourebi LR/cd
Subfamily: Bovinae
Genus: Syncerus
 African buffalo, Syncerus caffer LR/cd
Genus: Tragelaphus
 Bongo, Tragelaphus eurycerus LR/nt
 Bushbuck, Tragelaphus scriptus LR/lc
 Sitatunga, Tragelaphus spekii LR/nt extirpated
Subfamily: Caprinae
Genus: Ammotragus
 Barbary sheep, Ammotragus lervia VU
Subfamily: Cephalophinae
Genus: Cephalophus
 Red-flanked duiker, Cephalophus rufilatus LR/cd
Genus: Sylvicapra
 Common duiker, Sylvicapra grimmia LR/lc
Subfamily: Hippotraginae
Genus: Addax
 Addax, Addax nasomaculatus CR
Genus: Hippotragus
 Roan antelope, Hippotragus equinus LC presence uncertain
Genus: Oryx
 Scimitar oryx, Oryx dammah EW
Subfamily: Reduncinae
Genus: Kobus
 Waterbuck, Kobus ellipsiprymnus LR/cd
 Kob, Kobus kob LR/cd
Genus: Redunca
 Bohor reedbuck, Redunca redunca LR/cd

Notes

References

See also
List of chordate orders
Lists of mammals by region
List of prehistoric mammals
Mammal classification
List of mammals described in the 2000s

Niger
Niger
Mammals